Cat Records was a subsidiary of TK Productions whose flagship label was TK Records.  It had no connections with the Cat Records label of the 1950s which was a division of Atlantic Records.  It was founded in 1969 and lasted until 1980.  Its most successful artist was Gwen McCrae.

External links 
Cat album discography

Defunct record labels of the United States
Record labels established in 1969
Record labels disestablished in 1980